Edward Hermon (2 April 1822 – 6 May 1881) was a British cotton magnate and Conservative Party politician.

At the 1868 general election he was elected on his first attempt a Member of Parliament (MP) for the two-seat constituency of Preston in Lancashire. He was re-elected in the 1874 and in 1880 general elections, and held the seat until he died in office in 1881, aged 59. The resulting by-election in Preston was held on 23 May 1881, and won by the Conservative candidate William Ecroyd.

Hermon's last recorded contribution to debates in the House of Commons was eight days before his death, aged 59, on 28 April 1881, when he asked Prime Minister Gladstone a sceptical question about the proposed commercial treaty with France.

Family
In 1872–78 Hermon had Wyfold Court built at Rotherfield Peppard near Henley-on-Thames in Oxfordshire. It is an elaborate Gothic Revival country house designed by the architect Somers Clarke.

Hermon's only daughter was Frances Caroline Hermon (died 1929), who was married in 1877 to Robert Trotter Hodge (1851–1937), who later became MP for Accrington and other constituencies. After being made a baronet in 1902, Hodge changed his surname to Hermon-Hodge in honour of his wife's family, and was later ennobled as Baron Wyfold.

References

External links
 

1822 births
1881 deaths
Conservative Party (UK) MPs for English constituencies
Politics of Preston
UK MPs 1868–1874
UK MPs 1874–1880
UK MPs 1880–1885